The Congos are a reggae vocal group from Jamaica which formed as the duo "Ashanti" Roy Johnson (tenor) (b. Roydel Johnson, 1947, Hanover, Jamaica) and Cedric Myton (falsetto) (b. 1947, Saint Catherine Parish, Jamaica), later becoming a trio with the addition of Watty Burnett (baritone) (b. early 1950s, Port Antonio, Jamaica), and have been active on and off from the mid-1970s until the present day. They are best known for their Heart of the Congos album, recorded with Lee "Scratch" Perry.

History
Myton had previously been a member of The Tartans in the late 1960s (along with Prince Lincoln Thompson, Devon Russell and Lindburgh Lewis), and Ras Michael's group, and had recorded with Thompson's Royal Rasses in the mid-1970s. He formed the Congos, initially as a duo with Johnson, recording the single "At the Feast" for Lee "Scratch" Perry. Perry expanded the group to a trio with the addition of Burnett, this line-up recording the classic roots reggae album Heart of the Congos in 1977 at Perry's Black Ark studio. The album featured illustrious backing singers such as Gregory Isaacs, The Meditations, and Barry LLewellyn and Earl Morgan of The Heptones. The album has been described as "the most consistently brilliant album of Scratch's entire career".

Perry's previous productions by Max Romeo and Junior Murvin had been huge commercial successes thanks to a deal with Island Records, but Perry was in dispute with Island at the time the Congos' album was finished, so it was released on his own Black Ark label, limiting its success overseas, and causing a rift with the group. The Congos went their own way, organising a limited pressing of the album themselves. United Kingdom label Go Feet eventually reissued the album in 1980, and although the group had recorded new material since leaving Perry, Heart of the Congos proved a hard act to follow and their other releases suffered as a consequence. Albums such as Congo Ashanti were sparser and sounded ordinary compared to Perry's kitchen-sink-and-all massive productions. 

Burnett quit the group, soon followed by Johnson, who embarked on a solo career. Myton continued to record as The Congos with various other musicians until the mid-1980s.

In the mid-1990s, The Congos reformed, with Myton and Burnett joined by Lindburgh Lewis, several albums following in subsequent years. In 2005 Myton recorded Give Them the Rights with a host of backup singers and star session players such as Sly and Robbie and Earl "Chinna" Smith, very much in the spiritual 70s roots vein.
In 2006, the UK reggae revival label Blood and Fire released the album Fisherman Style featuring a remixed version of the classic cut "Fisherman" from Heart of the Congos plus such legends as Horace Andy, Big Youth, Dillinger, Prince Jazzbo, Luciano, Freddie McGregor, Gregory Isaacs, Max Romeo, Mykal Rose, Dean Fraser, Sugar Minott, and U-Roy doing their own new versions over the original rhythm.

In 2002, they appeared on the album The Slackers and Friends by the ska/reggae band The Slackers.

In 2008, The Congos appeared in the independent feature film, Wah Do Dem which captures them performing "Fisherman," and "Congoman Chant," under a full moon at Helshire Beach outside Kingston.  

In 2009, Myton, Burnett, and Johnson reunited with Perry to record the album Back in the Black Ark, which, despite its title, was recorded at Myton's studio in Portmore and at Mixing Lab, Kingston.

Discography
Albums
Heart of the Congos (1977) Black Ark
Congo aka Congo Ashanti (1979) Congo Ashanty/CBS
Image of Africa (1979) Congo Ashanty/Epic/CBS
Heart of the Congos(1981) Go-Feet Records
Best of Congos vol. 1 (1983) Tafari
Natty Dread Rise Again (1997) RAS
Revival (1998) VP
Live at Maritime Hall: San Francisco (2000) 2B1
Lion Treasure (2001) JDC/M10
Give Them the Rights (2005) Young Tree
Fisherman Style (2006) Blood and Fire
Cock Mouth Kill Cock (2006) Explorer Music also issued as Feast (2006) Kingston Sounds
Swinging Bridge (2006) Mediacom/Nocturne
Back in the Black Ark (2009) Mediacom
We Nah Give Up" Pura Vida & The Congos(2011), Lost Ark Music 001Dub Feast (2012) Jamaican RecordingsFRKWYS Vol. 9: Icon Give Thank (2012), RVNG Intl – with Sun Araw and M. Geddes GengrasMorning Star (2018), Lost Ark Music – with Pura Vida

Contributing artistThe Rough Guide to Reggae'' (1997) World Music Network

References

External links
 The Congos at Roots Archives
 The Congos album discography from Rootsdub
Discography at Discogs

Jamaican reggae musical groups
Performers of Rastafarian music
Roots Reggae Library